Break in or break-in may refer to:

 Burglary, the criminal act of entering a building to commit an offense, usually theft
 Break-in (mechanical run-in), a procedure for preparing new equipment (such as vehicle engines) for the rest of its working life by running it under prescribed conditions at the beginning
 Shoe break-in, wearing shoes enough so they feel more comfortable
 Trespass, the act of intruding another's property
 Break In, a 1989 Japanese video game
 Break-in (Death Note episode)
 Break-in (film), a 1927 German film
 Break-in, a type of novelty record using samples of popular music, developed by producer Dickie Goodman

See also
 
 
 
 
 Breaking (disambiguation)
 Break (disambiguation)